The Royal Shakespeare Company is a major British theatre company, founded in 1879 as the Shakespeare Memorial Theatre, based in Stratford-upon-Avon, England.
Australian Shakespeare Company, theatre company in Melbourne, Australia
The Chesapeake Shakespeare Company, theatre company in Baltimore, Maryland, U.S.
English Shakespeare Company, former theatre company based in London in the 1980s
Stamford Shakespeare Company, amateur theatre company in Rutland, England
Marin Shakespeare Company, theatre company in San Rafael, California, U.S.
Metaverse Shakespeare Company, virtual theatre company in Second Life virtual world